Carl Joseph Barzilauskas (born March 19, 1951 in Waterbury, Connecticut) is a former American football defensive tackle who played six seasons in the National Football League for the New York Jets and the Green Bay Packers. He is the nephew of Fritz Barzilauskas. He played college football for Indiana University Bloomington. He was traded from the Jets to the Packers on June 6, 1978 for fourth- and fifth-round selections (98th and 125th overall–Johnnie Lynn and Stan Blinka respectively) in the 1979 NFL Draft.

References

External links
 

1951 births
Living people
American football defensive tackles
American people of Lithuanian descent
Green Bay Packers players
Indiana Hoosiers football players
New York Jets players
Sportspeople from Waterbury, Connecticut
Players of American football from Connecticut